WPZA (107.9 MHz FM, Air1) is a radio station broadcasting a contemporary worship music format. It is licensed to Canton, Illinois and serves the Peoria radio market.  The station is currently owned by Educational Media Foundation.

History
WPZA was known as WBYS-FM for many years on 98.3 FM with an easy listening format.  In August 1997, the station was upgraded to 25,000 watts and moved to 107.9 FM.  This allowed the station to target the Peoria market, and in late 2004 switched to a Classic Hits format as "CD 107.9".

WPZA is one of only 5 radio stations in the Peoria radio market with a Class B signal. In July, 2008, a tornado took down the original tower constructed in 1947 for sister station WBYS, and a new tower was constructed and registered in March, 2009.

On December 27, 2010, WCDD changed the format to country, branded as "CD Country 107.9".

On December 11, 2020, WCDD was sold to EMF (Educational Media Foundation) for $170,000, pending a flip to Air1. The station signed off on March 31, 2021, at 6:00 PM CDT to make way for the switch to Air1, with "A Boy Named Sue" from Johnny Cash being the final song played on the format before signing off.

On March 31, 2021, Illiana Communications, LLC closed the sale on WCDD to EMF, who changed the call sign to WPZA. Meanwhile, the country format has now moved to WBYS and rebranded as "94.1 BYS."

Sports coverage
From 2012 to 2014, WCDD served as the broadcast home of the Peoria Rivermen, during the team's years in both the AHL and SPHL. The team's broadcasts came internet-exclusive after the expiration of the 2-year deal with the station.

References

External links

Canton, Illinois
PZA
Educational Media Foundation radio stations
Air1 radio stations